John Thomas Manger is an American law enforcement officer who is the chief of the United States Capitol Police. He had retired as chief of police in Montgomery County, Maryland after a 42 year career. In the aftermath of the 2021 United States Capitol attack, he was selected to lead the United States Capitol Police, being sworn in on July 23, 2021.

Early life and education

When he was 14, his family moved from Baltimore City to Silver Spring, Maryland. Manger has three siblings.

Manger graduated from the University of Maryland, College Park in 1976 with a Bachelor of Science degree in criminal justice. He is also a graduate of the FBI National Academy.

Career

He started his career in law enforcement in January 1977 as an officer with the Fairfax County Police Department. From 1998 to 2004, Manger served as chief of the department.

In 2004 Manger took over as chief of police in Montgomery County, Maryland. He retired from the post in 2019. Manger took over as chief of the United States Capitol Police on July 23, 2021, replacing Acting Chief Yogananda Pittman.

Personal life 
Manger is married and has two children.

Awards and honors

 1993 Silver Medal of Valor from Fairfax County, Virginia
 2007 Law Enforcement Award from the Brady Campaign to Prevent Gun Violence
 2012 inducted into the Montgomery county Human Rights Hall of Fame
 2016 Gorowitz Institute Service Award from the Anti-Defamation League
 2017 Keeper of the Dream award from the National Immigration Forum
 2018 FBI National Executive Institute Associates Penrith Award
 2018 recognised as one of the Washingtonians of the Year by Washingtonian magazine

References

External links

American police chiefs
University System of Maryland alumni
United States Capitol Police officers
Living people
Year of birth missing (living people)
People from Baltimore
People from Silver Spring, Maryland
People from Fairfax County, Virginia